Alexandru Avrămescu is a Romanian footballer who plays as a midfielder for Liga III side Gilortul Târgu Cărbunești.

Honours
Gilortul Târgu Cărbunești
 Liga IV – Gorj County: 2018–19

References

External links

Alexandru Avrămescu at frf-ajf.ro

1991 births
Living people
Sportspeople from Târgu Jiu
Romanian footballers
Association football midfielders
Liga I players
CS Pandurii Târgu Jiu players
CS Turnu Severin players
CS Național Sebiș players